Dr. Terry A. Murrell is the third president of Western Iowa Tech Community College in Sioux City, Iowa.

Education
Murrell earned his bachelor's degree in mathematics and computer science from the University of Nebraska at Kearney in 1990, an MPA in Labor Management from the University of Louisville in 1995, and a Ph.D. in Education from the University of Nebraska-Lincoln in 2005.

Career
During Murrell's tenure, the college has undergone renovations of existing facilities, seen upgrades to the student learning environments in the Kiser Building and community meeting area in the Corporate College. In 2014, another housing complex, Prairie Place, was added to the Sioux City Campus and a permanent WITCC Le Mars Center was opened.

Personal life
Murrell lives in Sioux City with his wife Cooteur and two sons, Peepi and Poupou.

References

University of Nebraska at Kearney alumni
University of Louisville alumni
University of Nebraska–Lincoln alumni
Heads of universities and colleges in the United States
1968 births
Living people
People from Geneva, Nebraska